Ansonia fuliginea, the North Borneo stream toad or North Borneo slender toad, is a species of toad in the family Bufonidae. It is endemic to Mount Kinabalu in Sabah, Malaysian Borneo.

Description
Males measure  and females  in snout–vent length. The body is relatively stocky. The snout is round. The tympanum is distinct. The flanks are darker than the middle dorsum and the head. The belly is also mostly dark. There are many rounded warts on the upper surfaces; the belly is granular. The tips of fingers and toes are swollen but without disks.

The tadpoles are unknown.

Habitat and conservation
Adults are terrestrial; the tadpoles presumably develop in streams. This rarely encountered species occurs in the Kinabalu Park, which is well protected. Whether it occurs outside the park is unknown. Selective logging is a potential threat.

References

fuliginea
Amphibians described in 1890
Endemic fauna of Borneo
Endemic fauna of Malaysia
Amphibians of Malaysia
Taxonomy articles created by Polbot
Amphibians of Borneo
Fauna of the Borneo montane rain forests
Fauna of Mount Kinabalu